Two ships of the Royal Navy have been called HMS Northampton, after the English town of Northampton:

  was a  armoured cruiser, launched in 1876, hulked as a boys' training ship in 1894 and sold for breaking up in 1905.
 HMS Northampton was previously , a torpedo gunboat launched in 1888 and renamed HMS Northampton in 1912 when she was used for harbour service. She was broken up in 1922.

Royal Navy ship names